Nebraska Wesleyan University (NWU) is a private Methodist-affiliated university in Lincoln, Nebraska.  It was founded in 1887 by Nebraska Methodists.  As of 2017, it has approximately 2,100 students including 1,500 full-time students and 300 faculty and staff. The school teaches in the tradition of a liberal arts college education. The university has 119 undergraduate majors, minors, and pre-professional programs in addition to three graduate programs.

History
Chartered on January 20, 1887, Nebraska Wesleyan University had an initial enrollment of 96. The initial teaching and administrative staff at this time totaled eight, including the chancellor.

In September 1887, the cornerstone was laid for Old Main, which became the central building of the campus. Still with no stairways, windows, or flooring on some floors, classes began in September 1888.  The first graduating class was four women in 1890.  The second graduating class, in 1891, was made up of four men. Nebraska Wesleyan received accreditation by the North Central Association of Colleges and Secondary Schools in 1914.

The school is located in the former town of University Place, Nebraska. Today, it is part of northeast Lincoln, Nebraska; the surrounding neighborhood is a historic residential and shopping area of Lincoln.

Early on, Nebraska Wesleyan was a college of liberal arts; schools of art, business and education; a music conservatory; an academy (high school) also comprising an elementary school and kindergarten.  The high school was discontinued in 1931, and the primary schools in 1941 (grade school) and 1942 (kindergarten).

Construction of the Duane W. Acklie Hall of Science began in 2017 with completion in 2019. It was the first new academic building in University Place in three decades.

Athletics
The Nebraska Wesleyan athletic teams are called the Prairie Wolves. The university is a member of the NCAA Division III ranks, primarily competing in the American Rivers Conference (ARC; formerly known as the Iowa Intercollegiate Athletic Conference (IIAC) since the 2016–17 academic year. The Prairie Wolves previously competed in the Great Plains Athletic Conference (GPAC) of the National Association of Intercollegiate Athletics (NAIA) from 1969–70 to 2015–16; as well as an NCAA D-III Independent while holding dual affiliation membership with the NAIA and the NCAA from 1982 to 2016.

Nebraska Wesleyan competes in 21 intercollegiate varsity sports. Men's sports include baseball, basketball, cross country, football, golf, soccer, swimming, tennis, track & field and wrestling. Women's sports include basketball, cheerleading, cross country, dance, golf, soccer, swimming, softball, tennis, track & field and volleyball. Former sports included women's bowling.

Mascot
Nebraska Wesleyan has been associated with four mascots in its history, the Sunflower (1894–1907), the Coyote (1907–1933), the Plainsman (1933–2000), and the Prairie Wolf (2000–present). The school colors are black and gold.

Athletic facilities
Nebraska Wesleyan's athletic facilities include Abel Stadium, which seats approximately 2,500 people and is used for college football, soccer and other events, and Snyder Arena, which seats 2,350 and is used for basketball and volleyball.

Accomplishments
The men's golf team won the 2006 NCAA Division III National Championship, its first in men's golf. The Prairie Wolves won by 10 strokes over the University of Redlands. The men's golf team has also won 35 conference championships; with back to back championships in 2018 and 2019.

The men's basketball team won the 2018 NCAA Division III National Championship, its first in men's basketball.

Greek life
IFC Fraternities
 Phi Kappa Tau
 Theta Chi
 Zeta Psi
Panhellenic Sororities
 Alpha Gamma Delta
 Delta Zeta
 Willard

Notable alumni

 Brenda Bence – author
 Kate Bolz – USDA State Director of Rural Development for Nebraska, former Nebraska State Senator, 2020 Democratic nominee for Nebraska's 1st Congressional District
 Shawn Bouwens – professional football player for NFL's New England Patriots, Detroit Lions, and Jacksonville Jaguars
 Ralph G. Brooks – 29th Governor of Nebraska
 
 Carl T. Curtis – former United States Senator
 Sandy Dennis – Oscar-winning actress
 John R. Dunning – physicist and key player in the Manhattan Project
 Mignon Eberhart – mystery novelist
 Rick Evans – singer and guitarist, writer of hit "In the Year 2525" as part of group Zager and Evans
 Ted Genoways – poet and former Virginia Quarterly Review editor
 John M. Gerrard –  current Judge for the Federal District of Nebraska and former Associate Justice on the Nebraska State Supreme Court
 Gene V Glass – Regents' Professor Emeritus at Arizona State University, author, social scientist
 Dwight Griswold – former United States Senator and Governor of Nebraska
 Mary Lou Harkness – university library director
 Kent Haruf – novelist
 Glenn Hefner – father of Hugh Hefner, former accountant and treasurer for Playboy

 Robert Hilkemann – Nebraska State Senator
 Harry Huge – international lawyer
 Lew Hunter – screenwriter and Chair Emeritus of UCLA Film Department
 Emily Kinney – television and theater actress (The Walking Dead)

 Lowen Kruse – minister and former Nebraska State Senator

 Jason Licht – general manager of NFL's Tampa Bay Buccaneers
 James Moeller – former Vice Chief Justice, Arizona State Supreme Court
 Bess Gearhart Morrison – Chautauqua speaker
 James Munkres – Professor Emeritus of Mathematics at MIT
 Orville Nave – author of Nave's Topical Bible
 John N. Norton – former United States Representative
 Marian Heiss Price – former Nebraska State Senator
 Robert Reed – science-fiction writer
 Ed Schrock – former Nebraska State Senator
 Coleen Seng – former Mayor of Lincoln, 2003–2007
 Warren K. Urbom – former Chief Judge for the Federal District of Nebraska
 Antwan Wilson – former Superintendent, Oakland Unified School District, Oakland, California, and Chancellor of District of Columbia Public Schools

See also 
 Alice Abel Arboretum

References

Further reading
 David H. Mickey, class of 1939, wrote Of Sunflowers, Coyotes and Plainsmen: A History of Nebraska Wesleyan University (1992). Its three volumes cover inception to 1987. Volume One describes how the university began and tracks its progress to 1921. The second volume covers the years 1921–1946 and the third volume encompasses 1946–1987.

External links 

 
 Official athletics website

 
Liberal arts colleges in Nebraska
Educational institutions established in 1887
Education in Lincoln, Nebraska
Buildings and structures in Lincoln, Nebraska
1887 establishments in Nebraska
Private universities and colleges in Nebraska